The 1993 Paris–Roubaix was the 91st running of the Paris–Roubaix single-day cycling race. Duclos-Lassalle won his second consecutive title, beating Ballerini with a bikethrow in the final sprint at the velodrome.

Results

References

1993
1993 in road cycling
1993 in French sport
Paris-Roubaix
April 1993 sports events in Europe